Bazayran or Bozayran may refer to:
Bozayran, Azerbaijan
Bëyuk Bozayran, Azerbaijan - "Greater Bazayran"
Baladzha Bozayran, Azerbaijan - "Lesser Bazayran"